The Association of National Parties and Organizations was a right-wing electoral alliance of the political parties in the Republic of Central Lithuania. Following the 1922 general elections, it hold 43 seats in the Sejm of Central Lithuania, the most of all parties. It consisted of the Popular National Union, National People's Union, Christian National Labour Party, and Polish Nonpartisan Organization. It supported the incorporation of the Central Lithuania into Poland, and the transfer of the executive powers to the Legislative Sejm of Poland. Its leader was Witold Bańkowski.

Citations

Notes

References 

Political parties in the Republic of Central Lithuania
Political parties disestablished in 1922
Right-wing parties in Europe
Conservative parties in Europe
Defunct political party alliances in Europe
Catholic political parties